Microsomal glutathione S-transferase 1 is an enzyme that in humans is encoded by the MGST1 gene.

Function 

The MAPEG family (Membrane-Associated Proteins in Eicosanoid and Glutathione metabolism) consists of six human proteins, two of which are involved in the production of leukotrienes and prostaglandin E, important mediators of inflammation. Other family members, demonstrating glutathione S-transferase and peroxidase activities, are involved in cellular defense against toxic, carcinogenic, and pharmacologically active electrophilic compounds. This gene encodes a protein that catalyzes the conjugation of glutathione to electrophiles and the reduction of lipid hydroperoxides. This protein is localized to the endoplasmic reticulum and outer mitochondrial membrane where it is thought to protect these membranes from oxidative stress. Four transcript variants of this gene encode one protein isoform.

References

Further reading

 

Human proteins
EC 2.5.1